Goofy Adventures is a comic book published by Disney Comics featuring Goofy as the main character.  In this comic book Goofy appears in different parody type stories.  This comic book lasted for 17 issues from April 1990 to August 1991, edited by David Seidman.

List of issues
 Balboa De Goofy, and Goofy Frankenstein Part 1
 Goofy Frankenstein Part 2, Goofy Peary at the North Pole, and Goof Brothers at Kitty Hawk
 Covered Wagons Ho and Alexander Goof
 The Great Goofidini
 Sir Goof and Knights of the Square Table, and First Goof on the Moon
 Super Goof and the Thief of Zanzipar
 Two Muskeeters Plus One
 Goofy Washington Our Nation's Flounder, A Goofy Look at the Movies, and Star Goof
 The Name's Goof James Goof
 Goofy Samurai, and A Goofy Look at Doors
 Goofis Khan
 Arizona Goof and the Lost Aztec Temple Part 1
 Arizona Goof and the Lost Aztec Temple Part 2
 Alexander Goof The Early Years
 Super Goof Versus the Cold Ray
 Sheerluck Goof and the Giggling Ghost of Notenny Moor, and The Goofy Wolfman
 Back in Time, and Tomb of Goofula

Even after the series was cancelled the Goofy stories occasionally appeared in Walt Disney's Comics and Stories, Donald and Mickey, Donald Duck and Mickey Mouse and Walt Disney Giant.

External links

 .

Goofy (Disney)
Disney Comics titles
Disney comics titles